The Division of Capricornia is an Australian Electoral Division in Queensland.

Capricornia is a traditionally a Labor-voting electorate, having been Labor-held for 72 years of the 100 years since 1922. However, Capricornia has recently trended towards the Coalition since 2013. This political realignment was particularly noticeable at the 2019 Australian federal election as blue-collar but highly paid mining workers deserted Labor for Pauline Hanson's One Nation and the Coalition. Similar voting trends can be found in the nearby electorates of Flynn, Dawson, and Herbert.

The current MP is Michelle Landry, a member of the Liberal National Party of Queensland.

Geography
Since 1984, federal electoral division boundaries in Australia have been determined at redistributions by a redistribution committee appointed by the Australian Electoral Commission. Redistributions occur for the boundaries of divisions in a particular state, and they occur every seven years, or sooner if a state's representation entitlement changes or when divisions of a state are malapportioned.

History

The division was one of the original 65 divisions contested at the first federal election. It is named after the Tropic of Capricorn, which runs through the Division. It is located on the central Queensland coast and its centre has always been the city of Rockhampton. On its current boundaries it also includes the town of Yeppoon and Ooralea, Marian and Sarina, all southern suburbs of Mackay.

The first election saw Alexander Paterson, with 51% of votes, narrowly elected over the ALP candidate Wallace Nelson. For most of its subsequent history it has been a fairly safe seat for the ALP. This was especially true when Gladstone was part of the seat from 1901 to 1984. Even after Gladstone was redistributed to Hinkler in 1984 (it is now part of Flynn), it remained one of the few non-metropolitan seats where Labor consistently did well. Labor held it for all but two terms from 1961 to 2013, the two exceptions being the high-tide elections of 1975 and 1996. Its best-known member was Frank Forde, who was briefly Prime Minister of Australia in 1945.

Capricornia is currently held by Michelle Landry for the Liberal National Party who in 2016, became the first conservative MP to serve more than one term in the seat since George Pearce.

Members

Election results

References

External links
 Division of Capricornia (Qld) — Australian Electoral Commission

Electoral divisions of Australia
Constituencies established in 1901
1901 establishments in Australia
Capricornia
Rockhampton